Alain Delon is a French actor. He is known as one of Europe's most prominent actors and screen sex symbols from the 1960s and 1970s.

Over the course of his career, Delon has starred in over 90 films in a variety of roles and genres. He achieved critical acclaim for his performance in films such as Purple Noon (1960), Rocco and His Brothers (1960), L'Eclisse (1962), The Leopard (1963), Le Samouraï (1967), and La Piscine (1969). He later cultivated an image as a "tough guy" with appearances in crime dramas such as The Sicilian Clan (1969), Borsalino (1970), Le Cercle Rouge (1970), Un flic (1972) and Borsalino & Co. (1974). His films, combined, have been seen in cinemas by over 135 million spectators. Delon worked with many well-known directors over his career, including Luchino Visconti, Jean-Luc Godard, Jean-Pierre Melville, Michelangelo Antonioni, and Louis Malle. He also appeared in nine films directed by Jacques Deray, including La Piscine (1969). As a theatre actor, Delon has performed in six different plays. As a singer, Delon has recorded seven songs, and one as a featured artist.

Delon is the credited film director for two films: Pour la peau d'un flic (1981) and Le battant (1983). Delon has also produced many films, primarily through his production company, which he founded in 1968.

Film

Unfinished films

Television

Stage

Discography

Shows

References and sources

References

Sources

External links 

 
 
 
 Alain Delon at UniFrance

Delon, Alain
Delon, Alain
Performances